Shakoor Ahmed Qureshi (born 15 September 1928) is a former Pakistani cricketer who played first-class cricket from 1948 to 1968. He toured England in 1954 with the Pakistan team but did not play Test cricket.

A batsman who often opened, and also usually kept wicket, Shakoor Ahmed made his first-class debut in 1947-48 in the second first-class match to be played in the newly independent Pakistan, keeping wicket for Punjab University in the first of what became a regular fixture against the Punjab Governor's XI. He captained Punjab University in these matches in 1950-51 and 1951-52. He also played for Pakistan Universities in a two-day match against the touring MCC in 1951-52, scoring 104 not out in the second innings.

In his first match in the Quaid-e-Azam Trophy, the semi-final of the inaugural 1953-54 competition, he scored his first century, 102 for Punjab against Railways. He was chosen as the reserve wicket-keeper for the 1954 tour of England, but scored only 154 runs at an average of 14.00 in nine first-class matches. The wicketkeeper-batsman Imtiaz Ahmed played all four Tests. In the 1954-55 season Shakoor Ahmed scored two centuries, including 116 not out in 38 overs against North-West Frontier Province.

He also played cricket in his native Uganda and Kenya. In 1956-57 when a Kenya Asians team toured South Africa to play against non-white teams, he scored centuries in two of the three matches against the South African Non-Europeans XI. When Punjab won the Quaid-e-Azam Trophy for the first time a few months later he scored 73 and 24 in the final. He was the only player to score a century in the final in 1959-60 when Karachi beat his team, Lahore.

He made his highest score in 1964-65 when he made 280 in nine and a half hours for Lahore Greens against Railways. He captained the team in the Quaid-e-Azam Trophy final later that season; in the second innings, needing 369 to win, after Lahore Greens were 45 for 4 Ahmed made 150 not out, of an eventual total of 263.

References

External links
 
 Shakoor Ahmed at CricketArchive

1928 births
Living people
Pakistani cricketers
Punjab University cricketers
Punjab (Pakistan) cricketers
Multan cricketers
Lahore cricketers
Kenyan cricketers
Cricketers from Kampala